is a Japanese female rhythmic gymnast.

Career
Noshitani helped the Japanese ladies secure a gold-medal triumph in the group all-around at the 2016 Asian Championships in Tashkent, Uzbekistan, and eventually competed as a member of the nation's rhythmic gymnastics squad at the Summer Olympics in Rio de Janeiro on that same year. There, she and fellow gymnasts Airi Hatakeyama, Rie Matsubara, Sayuri Sugimoto, and Kiko Yokota attained a total score of 34.200 on the combination of ribbons, hoops, and clubs to wrap up the group all-around final roster of eight teams in last place.

She competed at the  2013 World Rhythmic Gymnastics Championships.

References

External links 
 
 Athlete profile at the Japanese Olympic Committee 

1997 births
Living people
Japanese rhythmic gymnasts
Gymnasts from Tokyo
Gymnasts at the 2016 Summer Olympics
Olympic gymnasts of Japan
Gymnasts at the 2020 Summer Olympics
20th-century Japanese women
21st-century Japanese women